Phil Garwood (24 December 1939 – 18 August 2011) was an  Australian rules footballer who played with Hawthorn in the Victorian Football League (VFL).

Notes

External links 

1939 births
2011 deaths
Australian rules footballers from Tasmania
Hawthorn Football Club players
Launceston Football Club players